The 320s decade ran from January 1, 320, to December 31, 329.

Significant people
 Constantine I

References